Claudiu Mihail Florian (born 1969) is a Romanian writer. He was born in Rupea in Brașov County and received a degree in German Studies from the University of Bucharest in 1994. After earning an MA degree from the same university in 1996, he obtained a second master's from Bielefeld University. Since 2002, he has worked in various diplomatic positions in Berlin and Bern. 

Florian is also an award-winning writer. His book Vârstele jocului. Strada Cetății (The Ages of the Game – Citadel Street), published  in 2012 by Cartea Românească, won the European Union Prize for Literature in 2016.

References

1969 births
Living people
People from Rupea
University of Bucharest alumni
Bielefeld University alumni
Romanian writers